Vienna In Love are a British alternative rock band, formed in London in 2011 by singer-guitarist Victor Cobbs and guitarist Branko Stefanovic. Vienna In Love's influences include  The Cure,  Placebo, Echo & the Bunnymen, Kent, and U2. Their single "Tokyo" was ranked at number 7 on The MTV Adria 's Top 20 Domaćica Chart on 2 October 2016.

Touring
Vienna In Love tour in various countries from Europe and the United States, They also performed at various music festivals like  Exit Festival and Arenal Sound

Awards and nominations

Discography

Studio albums
A Modern British Icon (2013)

EPs and singles
Love Is Like War  (2011) 
Bushido (Remixes) (2015) 
Tokyo  (2016)

References

External links

British alternative rock groups
Musical groups established in 2011
Musical groups from London
2011 establishments in England